Under the Mistletoe is the first Christmas album and second studio album by Canadian singer Justin Bieber. The album was released on November 1, 2011.

The album debuted at number one on the US Billboard 200 chart, selling 210,000 copies in its first week. This also became the first Christmas album by a male artist to debut at number one. This was also Justin’s third number-one album following “Never Say Never: The Remixes” earlier in the year. The album was certified double platinum by the Recording Industry Association of America (RIAA) for sales of over two million units. He was also the fourth artist to chart on the Billboard 200 under the age of 18 twice, and ninth overall.

Background
On August 25, 2011, Bieber announced that he would be releasing his first Christmas album and second studio album later in 2011. Manager Scooter Braun and vocal producer Kuk Harrell confirmed a week later that Bieber had collaborated with Sean Kingston and Taylor Swift and had also worked with producers The Messengers. Later that month, it was announced that Boyz II Men, Usher, and The Band Perry were also collaborating with Bieber on the album. On September 30, 2011, Bieber released the official album cover and album name on Facebook. On October 4, 2011, Mariah Carey revealed that she and Bieber recorded her song "All I Want for Christmas Is You" as a duet for the new album. Bieber's version of the song "Santa Claus Is Coming To Town" from the motion picture Arthur Christmas, samples "I Want You Back" and "ABC" by the Jackson 5.

Singles
The album's first single "Mistletoe", was written and produced with The Messengers, and it was released on October 17, 2011. The album's second single, "All I Want for Christmas Is You (SuperFestive!)", was released as a radio airplay only single in Italy on December 9, 2011.

Critical reception

Under the Mistletoe was met with generally mixed reviews. At Metacritic, the album received an average score of 54, based on four critical reviews. AllMusic also assessed the critical consensus giving the album three stars.

Andy Kellman of AllMusic credited Bieber "for the effort he put in" and for not "sleepwalking" through the Christmas album like "most artists," although he did feel that Bieber "definitely sounds more enthused by the original songs" while calling Bieber's "Drummer Boy" goofy but complimenting his version of "Santa Claus Is Coming To Town." Writing for Entertainment Weekly, Adam Markovitz also felt that the original songs were much better than the covers, calling them "sleigh-ride-smooth R&B jangles" while writing that "the classics bring no cheer." Jason Scott of The Seattle Post-Intelligencer gave the album a positive review, writing that Bieber "proves he is a mainstay in the industry by crafting a highly energetic and expressive album that is filled to the brim with eggnog flavored treats, ranging from straight up pop and R&B to country" and named it "a wonderful performance."

Caroline Sullivan of The Guardian opined that "the guests are the album's saving grace" and felt that "they generally outclass his by quite a stretch," although she did feel that "holds his own" against Mariah Carey. Jon Caramanica of The New York Times wrote that Bieber "[hadn't] ever sounded this good" but also felt that he was at times overshadowed on the guest appearances.

Commercial performance
Under the Mistletoe debuted at number one on the US Billboard 200 chart, selling 210,000 copies in its first week. This became Bieber's third US number one debut and his fifth US top ten album. It was also became the first Christmas album by a male artist to debut at number one and the first solo artist to have three number one albums before his 18th birthday. In its second week, the album dropped to number six on the chart, selling an additional 97,000 copies, which was a 54% decrease. In its third week, the album climbed to number five on the chart, selling 84,000 more copies. In its fourth week, the album dropped to number six on the chart, selling 142,000 copies, which was an 69% increase. By the end of 2011, the album totaled 1,245,000 copies in US sales, according to Nielsen SoundScan, and was the eleventh best-selling album of the year. As of December 2015, the album had sold 1,510,000 copies. On June 24, 2020, the album was certified double platinum by the Recording Industry Association of America (RIAA) for combined sales and album-equivalent units of over two million units in the United States.

The album also debuted within the top 10 in Spain, Australia, Norway, and the Netherlands.

Track listing

Note: (*) denotes a co-producer

Personnel
Credits are adapted from liner notes

Justin Bieber – vocals (3, 9, 11, lead on 1–2, 4–6, 8, 10, singing on 7), rap vocals (7), live drums (7), music producer (7, 9)
Nasri Atweh – music producer (10), musical arrangements (10), additional background vocals (2)
The Band Perry – vocals (10)
Brandon Bee – drums (10), bass played by (10)
Jonathan Berry – guitar (10)
Durell Bottoms – assistant recording engineer (5)
Boyz II Men – vocals (5)
Chris Brown – background vocals (8), music producer (8)
Busta Rhymes – rap vocals (7)
Mariah Carey – lead vocals (6), music producer (6)
Tim Carmon – piano (3), keyboards (11)
Martin Cooke – assistant recording engineer (6)
Josh Cross – music producer (5)
Melonie Daniels – background vocals (6)
Brad Dechter – musical arrangement (6), orchestral arrangement (6)
Greg DePante – assistant recording engineer (6)
Nicolas Essig – assistant recording engineer (5)
Iain Findlay – assistant recording engineer (8)
Angie Fisher – background vocals (6)
Jesus Garnica – assistant audio mixing (1, 4–5, 7–8)
Jerohn Garrett – drums (6)
Brian Garten – recording engineer (6)
Sharlotte Gibson – background vocals (6)
Josh Gudwin – recording engineer
Kuk Harrell – vocal producer, music producer (11), background vocals (1, 4)
Bernard Harvey – music producer (5)
Bryan Jackson – background vocals (4)
Randy Jackson – music producer (6)
Jaycen Joshua – audio mixing (1, 4–5, 7–8)
Sean K. – music producer (3, 7), music programming (3)
Thomas Kanarek – assistant recording engineer (6)
Mitch Kinney – assistant recording engineer (2, 5, 8)
Miguel Lara – assistant recording engineer (1–5, 7–11)
Damien Lewis – assistant audio mixing (2–3, 6), additional recording engineer (9–11)
Peter Mack – assistant recording engineer (6)
Sherry McGhee – background vocals (6)
The Messengers – music producers (2), instrumental arrangement (2), vocal arrangement (2)
Adam Messinger – all instruments (2)
Luis Navarro – assistant recording engineer (1, 4)
George Nozuka – additional background vocals (10)
Chris "Tek" O'Ryan – recording engineer
Charlie Paakkari – assistant recording engineer (6)
Aaron Pearce – music producer (1, 4), music programming (1, 4)
Doc Powell – guitar (6)
Daniela Rivera – assistant audio mixing (2–3), additional recording engineer (9–11)
Marc Shaiman – musical arrangement (6), orchestral arrangement (6)
Jason Sherwood – assistant recording engineer (3)
Adonis Shropshire – additional background vocals (5)
Brian Springer – recording engineer (8)
C. "Tricky" Stewart – music producer (1, 4), music programming (1, 4)
Tom Strahle – guitar (9)
S'Von – piano (10)
Phil Tan – audio mixing (2–3, 6, 9–11)
Antwan Thompson – music producer (8)
Lloyd "Sonny" Thompson – bass played by (6)
Michael Thompson – guitar (1, 3–4)
Micah Tolentino – background vocals (6)
Nick Turpin – music producer (10), musical arrangement (10), additional background vocals (10)
Usher – vocals (3)
Stephen Villa – assistant recording engineer (1, 4)
Jerrol "Boogie" Wizzard – music producer (8)
James "Big Jim" Wright – music producer (6), keyboards (6)

Charts

Weekly charts

Year-end charts

Certifications and sales

See also
 Justin Bieber discography
 List of Billboard number-one holiday albums of the 2010s

References

2011 Christmas albums
Justin Bieber albums
Christmas albums by Canadian artists
Albums produced by Tricky Stewart
Albums produced by the Messengers (producers)
Albums produced by Kuk Harrell
Pop Christmas albums